Present Age was an American quarterly magazine published from 1870 to 1872 in New Orleans, by James E. Waldo.

References

Defunct magazines published in the United States
Little magazines
Magazines established in 1870
Magazines disestablished in 1872
1870 establishments in the United States
Mass media in New Orleans
Magazines published in Louisiana